C.M. Bhandari is an Indian Civil servant and was the Indian ambassador to United Arab Emirates.

Positions held
Ambassador to Poland.
Ambassador to Lithuania.

Indian Foreign Service
He is a 1974 batch officer of the Indian Foreign Service.

Indian Ambassadors to United Arab Emirates

External links
Ambassadors of India to UAE

References

Ambassadors of India to the United Arab Emirates
Indian Foreign Service officers
Year of birth missing (living people)
Living people